The 2011 Boundary Ford Curling Classic was held from November 25 to 28 at the Lloydminster Curling Club in Lloydminster, Alberta as part of the 2011–12 World Curling Tour. The purse for the event was CAD$32,000, and the event was held in a triple knockout format.

Teams

Results

A Event

B Event

C Event

Playoffs

References

External links

Boundary Ford Curling Classic
Boundary Ford Curling Classic
Sport in Lloydminster
Curling competitions in Alberta